Harry Innes Thornton Jr. (c. 1834 –  February 25, 1895)  was a United States Democratic politician and attorney in California.

Born in Greene County, Alabama, Thornton followed his family to California. In 1841, his father, Harry Innis Thornton, Sr., was a judge and member of the Alabama Legislature, residing in Eutaw, Alabama. By 1851, Thornton Sr. moved to California and was appointed to the federal Public Land Commission to address property ownership in California. By 1854, Thornton Jr.'s sister and her husband, James D. Thornton, had moved to San Francisco, also.

Thornton Jr. was a member of the California State Senate during the 1850s. At the start of the American Civil War, he gave a speech on the floor of the Senate defending the Southern states' rights to succeed. He resigned from the Legislature and went to serve in the Army of the Confederate States of America. He was wounded at the Battle of Chickamauga Sept. 18–20, 1863 while serving with the 58th Regiment Alabama Infantry. After the war, he returned to California and practiced law in that state and Nevada, handling complex mining litigation. He died in Fresno, California, on February 25, 1895.

References

1834 births
1895 deaths
Confederate States Army officers
People of Alabama in the American Civil War
People of California in the American Civil War
Democratic Party California state senators
Lawyers from San Francisco
19th-century American lawyers
19th-century American politicians